Mykola Petrovych Pavlov (born 20 June 1954 in Kyiv, Ukrainian SSR) is a bald former Ukrainian football defender, and former head-coach of Illychivets Mariupol in the Ukrainian Premier League. He is Merited Master of Sports of the USSR (1983) and Merited Coach of Ukraine.

Education
 Dnipropetrovsk Institute of Physical Culture
 Higher School of Coaches (Moscow) (1986–87)

Playing career
Pavlov began his playing career in 1972, playing for "Spartak Brest", (later renamed "Bug Brest", now FC Dinamo Brest) in the Belarusian SSR. The club played in the old Soviet Second League. After three years there he moved to Krylia Sovetov, a club in the Soviet Top League. Four seasons and three years later, in 1979 he moved back to Belarusian SSR to play for their best team in the Soviet Top League, Dinamo Minsk. Another 3 years later, in 1982 he was on the move again, this time back to Ukraine to play in Odessa for Chernomorets Odessa. The following season he moved to Dnipro Dnipropetrovsk. His two seasons there were the most successful of his career. He became the USSR champion in 1983, and won the bronze medal the following year (1984).

International career
Pavlov was capped once for the USSR. He played in a 2–1 friendly loss against West Germany, on 28 March 1984 in Hanover.

Coaching career
In 1988 Pavlov took up the head-coach position of Kolos Nikopol. During the 1990s he coached Tavriya Simferopol, Krystal Kherson, Dnipro Dnipropetrovsk. While coach of Dnipro he was brought on to be the caretaker head-coach of the Ukraine national football team. In the 1995–96 season Pavlov was coach of Dynamo Kyiv, leading them to a Ukrainian League title. Following Dynamo he has coached other Ukrainian clubs, including a return to Tavriya Simferopol, then at FC Illychivets Mariupol (7 years there), and FC Stal Alchevsk. In the winter of 2007 he was brought in as head-coach at FC Vorskla Poltava. In his first season with the team he led them to an 8th-place finish, and into the quarter-finals of Ukrainian Cup.

On 2 February 2017 Pavlov announced that he retired from coaching career.

Managerial statistics

Honours

Player
 Soviet Top League Champion: 1983
 Soviet Top League Bronze: 1984

Coach
 Ukrainian Premier League Champion: 1994–95
 Ukrainian Cup Champion: 2009

Orders and special awards
 Knight of the Order "For merits": 2009

References

External links
RussiaTeam biography 
Brief biography 
Profile on Odessa Football 

1954 births
Living people
Ukrainian footballers
Soviet footballers
Soviet Union international footballers
Ukrainian football managers
Ukraine national football team managers
Soviet football managers
Footballers from Kyiv
PFC Krylia Sovetov Samara players
FC Chornomorets Odesa players
FC Dnipro players
FC Dinamo Minsk players
Soviet Top League players
FC Elektrometalurh Nikopol managers
SC Tavriya Simferopol managers
FC Krystal Kherson managers
FC Dnipro managers
FC Dynamo Kyiv managers
FC Mariupol managers
FC Stal Alchevsk managers
FC Vorskla Poltava managers
Chevaliers of the Order of Merit (Ukraine)
Ukrainian Premier League managers
Higher School of Coaches alumni
Merited Coaches of Ukraine
Honoured Masters of Sport of the USSR
FC Dynamo Brest players
Association football defenders
FC Livyi Bereh Kyiv